The 2017 Canon Media Awards were presented on 19 May 2017 at The Langham, Auckland, New Zealand. Awards were made in the categories of digital, feature writing, general, magazines, newspapers, opinion writing, photography, reporting and videography. The Wolfson scholarship, health journalism scholarships, and awards for editorial executive and outstanding achievements, were also presented.

Winners

Digital 

 Best Blog Site: Villainesse
 Best News Website or App: Newshub
 Website of the Year: NZ Herald

Feature Writing (long-form, +2500 words) 

 Best Feature Writer - Junior: Don Rowe, 1972 magazine and New Zealand Geographic
 Feature Writer - arts and entertainment: David Larsen, Metro
 Feature Writer - business and politics: Simon Wilson, Metro
 Feature Writer - crime and justice: James Mahoney, Metro
 Feature Writer - general: Aaron Smale, RNZ
 Feature Writer - health and lifestyle: Kirsty Johnston, NZ Herald
 Feature Writer - sport: Dylan Cleaver, NZ Herald
 Feature Writer of the Year: Joanna Wane, North & South
 Feature Writer of the Year (runner-up): Aaron Smale, Mana magazine, North & South and RNZ

Feature Writing (short-form, up to 2500 words) 

 Best Feature Writer - Junior: Christopher Reive, Taranaki Daily News
 Feature Writer - arts and entertainment: Charlie Gates, The Press
 Feature Writer - business and politics: Mava Enoka, The Wireless
 Feature Writer - crime and justice: Jared Savage, NZ Herald
 Feature Writer - general: Adam Dudding, Sunday Star-Times
 Feature Writer - general (runner-up): Madeleine Chapman, The Spinoff
 Feature Writer - health and lifestyle: Greg Bruce, NZ Herald
 Feature Writer - sport: Jonathan Carson, Sunday Star-Times
 Feature Writer of the Year: Nikki Macdonald, The Dominion Post and Sunday Star-Times

General 

 Best artwork/graphics: Toby Morris, RNZ and The Wireless
 Best artwork/graphics (runner-up): Richard Dale, NZ Herald
 Best headline: Matthew Dallas, Manawatu Standard
 Best headline (runner-up): Ian Allen, Marlborough Express
 Best trade/specialist publication and/or website: Jackie Harrigan, NZ Dairy Exporter magazine
 Cartoonist of the Year: Sharon Murdoch, Sunday Star-Times, The Dominion Post and The Press
 Cartoonist of the Year (runner-up): Toby Morris, RNZ and The Wireless
 Reviewer of the Year: Duncan Greive, NZ Herald and The Spinoff

Magazines 

 Best magazine design: HOME
 Best magazine design (runner-up): Mana magazine
 Best newspaper-inserted magazine: Your Weekend/The Dominion Post, The Press and Waikato Times
 Magazine of the Year: New Zealand Geographic

Newspapers 

 Best newspaper front page: Weekend Herald
 Canon Community Newspaper of the Year: Feilding-Rangitikei Herald
 Canon Newspaper of the Year: Weekend Herald
 Newspaper of the Year (more than 30,000 circulation): NZ Herald
 Newspaper of the Year (up to 30,000 circulation): Nelson Mail
 Weekly Newspaper of the Year: Weekend Herald

Opinion Writing 

 Opinion Writer - business and politics: Simon Wilson, Public Address, RNZ and The Spinoff
 Opinion Writer - general: Lizzie Marvelly, Weekend Herald
 Opinion Writer - humour/satire: Steve Braunias, NZ Herald
 Opinion Writer - sport: Dylan Cleaver, NZ Herald
 Opinion Writer of the Year: Duncan Garner, The Dominion Post

Photography 

 Best feature photo: Richard Robinson, New Zealand Geographic
 Best general photo: Paul Taylor, Hawke's Bay Today
 Best news photo: Blair Pattinson, Otago Daily Times
 Best photo (junior): Christel Yardley, Waikato Times
 Best photo essay: Mike Scott, NZ Herald
 Best portrait photo: Meek Zuiderwyk, Metro
 Best sports photo: Chris Cameron, NZ Herald
 Photographer of the Year: Alan Gibson, NZ Herald

Reporting 

 Best coverage of a major news event: "Kaikoura earthquake", Stuff, Kaikoura Star, The Dominion Post, The Marlborough Express and The Press
 Best editorial campaign or project: "#buythisbeachNZ", Stuff
 Best editorial campaign or project (runner-up): "Panama papers" RNZ, TVNZ and Nicky Hager
 Best investigation: Matt Nippert, NZ Herald
 Best Reporter (Junior): Donna-Lee Biddle, Stuff and Waikato Times
 Best (single) news story: Olivia Carville and Mike Scott, NZ Herald
 Business Journalist of the Year: Gareth Vaughan, Interest
 Business Journalist of the Year (runner-up): Matt Nippert and Caleb Tutty, NZ Herald
 Community Journalist of the Year: Paul Taylor, Mountain Scene
 Regional Journalist of the Year: Aaron Leaman, Stuff and Waikato Times
 Reporter - arts and entertainment: Vicki Anderson, Stuff and The Press
 Reporter - crime and justice: Eugene Bingham, Phil Johnson, Toby Longbottom and Paula Penfold (Stuff Circuit team)
 Reporter - general: Lane Nichols, Weekend Herald
 Reporter - health and lifestyle: Dylan Cleaver, NZ Herald
 Reporter - Maori and ethnic affairs: Renee Kahukura Iosefa, Maori Television
 Reporter of the Year: Matt Nippert, NZ Herald
 Science and Technology Award: Kate Evans, New Zealand Geographic
 Sports Journalist of the Year: Dylan Cleaver, NZ Herald
 Sports Journalist of the Year (runner-up): Liam Napier, Sunday Star-Times
 Student Journalist of the Year: Miri Schroeter, Manawatu Standard

Videography 

 Best feature video: Mike Scott, NZ Herald
 Best news video: Ross Giblin, Stuff
 Best sports video: Brett Phibbs, Mike Scott and Peter Visagie, NZ Herald
 Videographer of the Year: Ross Giblin, Stuff
 Videographer of the Year (runner-up): Mike Scott, NZ Herald

nib Health Journalism Scholarships 

 nib Health Journalism Scholarship - Junior: Rachel Thomas, Stuff
 nib Health Journalism Scholarship - Senior: Dylan Cleaver, NZ Herald AND Aaron Leaman, Stuff and Waikato Times

Editorial Executive of the Year 

 Glen Scanlon, head of digital media, RNZ

Wolfson Fellowship 

 Miriyana Alexander, Editor of the Weekend Herald and Herald on Sunday

NPA Outstanding Achievement Awards 

 Donna Chisholm, feature writer and editor
 Ross Setford, photographer
 Matamata Chronicle, 50 years' publishing
 NZ Cartoon Archive, 25 years' archiving cartoons

References 

2017 awards
2017 in New Zealand
New Zealand awards
Journalism awards
Mass media in New Zealand
2017 in New Zealand television